Mont Rogneux is a mountain of the Swiss Pennine Alps, overlooking Liddes in the canton of Valais. It is a mountain located north of the Petit Combin and Grand Combin. Facing the Verbier ski resort and neighbouring the Bruson lifts.

References

External links
 Mont Rogneux on Hikr

Mountains of the Alps
Alpine three-thousanders
Mountains of Switzerland
Mountains of Valais